Paratragon tragonoides is a species of beetle in the family Cerambycidae. It was described by Lepesme in 1953, originally under the genus Poimenesperus.

References

Pachystolini
Beetles described in 1953